The 2018–19 Women's EHF Champions League main round began on 25 January and was concluded on 10 March 2019. A total of twelve teams competed for eight places in the knockout stage of the 2018–19 Women's EHF Champions League.

Qualified teams

Format
In each group, teams played against each other in a double round-robin format, with home and away matches. After completion of the group stage matches, the top four teams advanced to the knockout stage. Points against teams from the same group were carried over.

Tiebreakers
In the group stage, teams were ranked according to points (2 points for a win, 1 point for a draw, 0 points for a loss). After completion of the group stage, if two or more teams have scored the same number of points, the ranking was determined as follows:

Highest number of points in matches between the teams directly involved;
Superior goal difference in matches between the teams directly involved;
Highest number of goals scored in matches between the teams directly involved (or in the away match in case of a two-team tie);
Superior goal difference in all matches of the group;
Highest number of plus goals in all matches of the group;
If the ranking of one of these teams is determined, the above criteria are consecutively followed until the ranking of all teams is determined. If no ranking can be determined, a decision shall be obtained by EHF through drawing of lots.

Groups
The matchdays were 25–27 January, 1–3 February, 8–10 February, 22–24 February, 1–3 March, 8–10 March 2018.

Group 1

Group 2

References

External links
Official website

Main round